Ex facie, Latin for "on the face [of it]," is a legal term typically used to note that a document's explicit terms are defective without further investigation.  For example, a contract between two parties would be void ex facie if, under a legal system where it was a binding requirement for validity, the document did not require party A to give consideration to party B for services rendered.

Ex facie (in this case "out of the face [of the court]") can also refer to contempt of court committed outside of the court, as opposed to contempt in facie ("in the face [of the court]"), which is committed in open court in front of the judge and can be punished immediately. 

Latin legal terminology